The action of Khan Baghdadi was an engagement during the Mesopotamian campaign in World War I.

Khan Baghdadi
The 15th Indian Division had been at Ramadi since its capture of the town in September 1917. On 9 March 1918, it advanced and occupied the town of Hit in a bloodless victory, the Ottoman forces evacuating without a shot being fired.

The next objective along the Euphrates was the town of Khan al Baghdadi. Most battles in Mesopotamia had been tied to the Tigris and Euphrates rivers. If an attack was successful, the loser would withdraw along the line of the river to prepared positions further back. Securing a proper victory was difficult. In an attempt to break with the usual pattern, the 15th Indian Division were supplied with 300 Ford lorries, the 8th Light Armoured Motor Battery (armoured cars), and the 11th Cavalry Brigade. A mobile blocking force was assembled using divisional infantry in the lorries, the armoured cars, the cavalry brigade, and one of the divisional artillery batteries equipped with double the usual number of horses.

This mobile force was then sent on a wide flanking march around Khan Baghdadi, and dug in behind the Ottoman positions. The remainder of the division then assaulted frontally in the normal fashion, and the Ottomans retreated from the town. They then ran unexpectedly into the blocking force, and their discipline quickly crumbled. The entire force of about 5000 men were taken prisoner.

The mobile force was then dispatched further up the Euphrates in the direction the Ottomans had expected to retreat. 46 miles further upstream was the settlement of Ana. Here was the main Ottoman supply base, which was now captured along with some high-ranking German officers attached to the Ottoman Army.

This was the last attack on the Euphrates Front. The diversion of transport to Dunsterforce during the summer resulted in the CinC of the Mesopotamian Theatre, Sir William Marshall, restricting advances to the Tigris Front only. When the armistice was declared on 1 November 1918, the 15th Indian Division were back downriver at Fallujah.

Notes and references

 Perry, F.W.  (1993). History of the Great War: Order of Battle of Divisions: Indian Army Divisions Pt. 5B. Ray Westlake Books. 
 Moberly, F.J. (1923). Official History of the War: Mesopotamia Campaign, Imperial War Museum. 
 Barker, A.J. (1967). The Neglected War: Mesopotamia 1914-18, Faber and Faber.

External links
 Life of Leonard Ball A family history article about a soldier with the 1/Ox & Bucks who were part of 15th Indian. Contains a map of the area and extracts from the battalion's war diary describing the action.

Khan Baghdadi 1918
Khan Baghdadi
Khan Baghdadi
Khan Baghdadi
Khan Baghdadi
Khan Baghdadi